Green Hollow is a valley in McDonald County in the U.S. state of Missouri.

Green Hollow most likely has the name of a local Green family.

References

Valleys of McDonald County, Missouri
Valleys of Missouri